Embalse is the Spanish word for "reservoir". It is found in many place names. If otherwise unqualified, it might refer to:
 Embalse, Córdoba, a town in Argentina.
 Embalse nuclear power plant, located near the above.